Lenasia Muslim School is an independent high school in Lenasia, Gauteng, South Africa. It achieved a 100% pass rate in the matriculation exams in the years 2003 to 2009, and in 2010, with a 99% pass rate, was one of the five top performing independent schools in Gauteng. It is situated in Lenasia extension 10.

As of 2017 Lenasia Muslim School's has a new principal. Appa Nazarine Suliman has taken over the role from Mr Rashid Mohammed.

References 

Educational institutions with year of establishment missing
Islamic secondary schools in Africa
Private schools in Gauteng
Islamic schools in South Africa